Elvin Natig ogly Badalov (born 14 June 1995) is a professional footballer who plays as a defender for Sumgayit in the Azerbaijan Premier League. Born in Russia, he represents the Azerbaijan national team.

Career

Club
On 23 February 2014, Badalov made his debut in the Azerbaijan Premier League for NeftçiBaku match against Sumgayit.

Honours
Neftçi Baku
Azerbaijan Cup (1): 2013–14

References

External links
 

1995 births
Living people
Association football defenders
Footballers from Saint Petersburg
Citizens of Azerbaijan through descent
Azerbaijani footballers
Azerbaijan international footballers
Azerbaijan under-21 international footballers
Azerbaijan youth international footballers
Russian footballers
Russian sportspeople of Azerbaijani descent
Azerbaijani expatriate footballers
Expatriate footballers in Austria
Azerbaijan Premier League players
FC Zenit Saint Petersburg players
Neftçi PFK players
Sabah FC (Azerbaijan) players
Sumgayit FK players